Joshua Michael Brodie  is a New Zealand cricketer who plays for the Wellington Firebirds in the State Championship. He was born 8 June 1987 in Wellington.

References

1987 births
Living people
New Zealand cricketers
Wellington cricketers
21st-century New Zealand people